Seljestad may refer to:

Places
Seljestad, Vestland, a village in Ullensvang municipality in Vestland county, Norway
Seljestad, Troms, a village in Harstad municipality in Troms og Finnmark county, Norway